Vazhiyorakazchakal is a 1987 Indian Malayalam-language mystery drama film, directed and produced by Thampi Kannanthanam under the banner of Sharon Films based on a screenplay by Dennis Joseph. The film stars Mohanlal, Ratheesh and Ambika in lead roles along with Jagathy Sreekumar, Suresh Gopi and M. G. Soman appearing in other pivotal roles. The film has musical score by S. P. Venkatesh. This film was a commercial success. The film ran for 50 days in 9 release centers.

Plot 
Baburaj, an IPS officer after marrying Sreedevi meets with a terrible accident. Sreedevi takes her husband to their Kodaikanal estate to help him recover. There she meets Raghavan, a Malayali driver who later helps her to take care of Babu. Sreedevi's lecher uncle Ravi pesters her with sexual advances. Baburaj, by the help of Ayurveda recovers quickly and realizes from the police diary that Raghavan is actually Lance Naik Antony Isaac who had helped Babu during his Dehradun training and in that time, Anthony, murdered his wife after finding out her extramarital relationship. Anthony is an escapee from police custody after being sentenced to death. Slowly, they realise that it is Ashok who betrayed Anthony's trust and cheated with his wife. Raghavan accidentally meets Ashok and remembers who Babu is and runs to their house to kill Ashok. Babu tries to stop an angry Raghavan, but fails to do so, and Raghavan surrenders after doing the deed.

The music Score by S P Venkatesh is a main part of the success of this film. The Art direction by Sabu Pravadas is also excellent in its Perfection

Cast
Mohanlal as Raghavan / Antony Issac
Ratheesh as Baburaj
Ambika as Sreedevi
Jagathy Sreekumar as Music school teacher
Suresh Gopi as Ashok
Charuhasan
Meena as Sreedevi's mother
Jayarekha as Lalitha
MG Soman as Ravi
Nalini
 Siddique as flirt
Mohan Jose as Sub Inspector of Police

Soundtrack
The music was composed by S. P. Venkatesh and the lyrics were written by Shibu Chakravarthy.Publicity Design Gayathry Ashok, Art Direction Sabu Pravadas and Associate Director Jimmy Luke.

References

External links
 

1987 films
1980s Malayalam-language films
Films directed by Thampi Kannanthanam